The Auxiliary Water Supply System (AWSS, though often referred to on manhole covers and hydrants as HPFS for High Pressure Fire System) is a high pressure water supply network built for the city of San Francisco in response to the failure of the existing emergency water system during the 1906 earthquake.  It was originally proposed by San Francisco Fire Department chief engineer Dennis T. Sullivan in 1903, with construction beginning in 1909 and finishing in 1913. The system is made up of a collection of water reservoirs, pump stations, cisterns, suction connections and fireboats. While the system can use both fresh or salt water, it is preferential to not use salt water, as it commonly causes galvanic corrosion in fire equipment.

The large, white oversized hydrants that are supplied by the AWSS/HPFS, of which there are 1889, are visible throughout the city. The hydrants have painted tops that are color-coded as to zone:
 Black topped hydrants are in the West of Twin Peaks zone, and are fed by the Twin Peaks Reservoir.
 Red topped hydrants are in the upper zone, and fed by the Ashbury Street tank.
 Blue topped hydrants are in the lower zone, fed by the Jones Street tank.

Upper zone

Reservoirs

Twin Peaks Reservoir 

The Twin Peaks Reservoir acts as the backbone of the AWSS system and is located in San Francisco's Twin Peaks hilltop. It is made up of a 10.5-million-gallon storage reservoir made out of  reinforced-concrete slabs. Fresh water is delivered from the city's domestic water system by two  centrifugal pumps. For safety, the reservoir is broken up into two tanks, and each tank can be emptied separately so that in case of a pipe breakage only half of the reservoir is lost.

Ashbury tank 

It is located at 1234 Clayton Street, in the city's Ashbury Heights neighborhood.

Jones Street tank 
It is located at 1239 Jones Street in the city's Nob Hill neighborhood.

Lower zone

Pump stations 

There are two emergency pumping stations present within the AWSS.

 Pump Station No. 1 - Basement of San Francisco Fire Department Headquarters, 698 Second Street at Townsend St.
 Pump Station No. 2 - Van Ness Avenue and San Francisco Bicycle Route 2 in Fort Mason.

Pumping Station No. 2 is listed on the National Register of Historic Places.

Fireboats 

To supplement any outright failure of the pumping stations or reservoirs, three fireboats can be utilized to deliver salt water into the system.

Cisterns 

As a final measure to counter any outright failure of the AWSS piping, a network of 177 independent underground water cisterns is present. These cisterns are easily spotted at street level by red brick circles or rectangles complete with manholes labeled CISTERN S.F.F.D

References 

Auxiliary Water Supply System
Fire Department
Water supply infrastructure in California
Fire prevention
Fire protection